The 1922 Connecticut Aggies football team represented Connecticut Agricultural College, now the University of Connecticut, in the 1922 college football season.  The Aggies were led by second year head coach J. Wilder Tasker, and completed the season with a record of 2–6–1.

Schedule

References

Connecticut
UConn Huskies football seasons
Connecticut Aggies football